Secrets of a Windmill Girl is a 1966 British exploitation film directed by Arnold L. Miller. It recounts the road to ruin of a young woman (Pauline Collins) who becomes involved with the striptease scene after becoming a dancer at the Windmill Theatre in London. The film features fan dances by former Windmill Theatre Company performers. It was originally released in Britain as part of a double bill with Naked as Nature Intended.

Cast
 Pauline Collins as Pat Lord
 April Wilding as Linda Grey
 Renée Houston as Molly - Dresser
 Derek Bond as Inspector Thomas
 Harry Fowler as Harry
 Howard Marion-Crawford as	Richard - Producer
 Peter Gordeno as Peter
 Peter Swanwick as Len Mason
 Martin Jarvis as Mike, Windmill Stage Manager
 Leon Cortez as 'Uncle Marty'

Critical reception
A reviewer in TV Guide wrote that "the premise of this film is compelling, but the treatment is empty-headed"; and The Spinning Image asked, "and those hoping for titillation? As with so much of the sexually-themed cinema of this (British) nation, they were offered it with a moralistic angle, as if telling the audience off for their prurience."

References

External links
 
 screen caps of Pauline Collins and April Wilding(from the Upstairs Downstairs webpage "Before Updown" section)

1966 films
British drama films
1960s exploitation films
1966 drama films
Films scored by Malcolm Lockyer
1960s English-language films
1960s British films